The Dublin Ladies' Senior Football Championship is the senior Ladies' Gaelic football competition featuring clubs affiliated to the Dublin GAA. Ballyboden St. Enda's are the competitions most successful club, having won 10 titles. Between 2000 and 2008 they completed a nine-in-a-row. They won their tenth title in 2010. In more recent seasons, the most successful club has been Foxrock–Cabinteely. Between 2015 and 2021 they completed a seven-in-a-row. The winners of the Dublin Senior Ladies' Football Championship are awarded the Michael Murphy Perpetual Cup. They also qualify to play in the Leinster Ladies' Senior Club Football Championship and if they win that, they qualify for the All-Ireland Ladies' Club Football Championship.

Finals
The winners of the Dublin Senior Ladies' Football Championship qualify to play in the Leinster Ladies' Senior Club Football Championship and if they win that, they qualify for the All-Ireland Ladies' Club Football Championship. Ballyboden St. Enda's, Portobello, Na Fianna and Foxrock–Cabinteely have all gone on to win Leinster titles. Ballyboden St. Enda's have also won two All-Irelands. Between 2015 and 2019 Foxrock–Cabinteely completed a five-in-a-row of Dublin and Leinster doubles.

Notes

Winners by club
Ballyboden St. Enda's are the competitions most successful club, having won 10 titles. Between 2000 and 2008 they completed a nine-in-a-row. Naomh Mearnóg ended their monopoly of championships when they defeated them in the 2009 semi-final. They won their tenth title in 2010. Portobello were the dominant club during the 1990s. After winning their first title in 1992, they completed a five-in-a-row between 1995 and 1999. In more recent seasons, the most successful club has been Foxrock–Cabinteely between 2015 and 2021 they completed a seven-in-a-row.

Trophy
The winners of the Dublin Senior Ladies' Football Championship are awarded the Michael Murphy Perpetual Cup. The trophy was donated by the Murphy family to honour and remember their son and brother, a pilot who was Dublin GAA enthusiast.

References

External links
 dublinladiesgaelic.ie

1985 establishments in Ireland
Ladies
Ladies' Gaelic football competitions
Ladies' Gaelic football in County Dublin
Senior Gaelic football county championships